Neobola is a genus of cyprinid fishes found mostly in East Africa.  There are currently five species in this genus.

Species 
 Neobola bottegoi Vinciguerra, 1895
 Neobola fluviatilis (Whitehead, 1962) (Athi Sardine)
Neobola kinondo 
 Neobola nilotica F. Werner, 1919
 Neobola stellae (Worthington, 1932)

References 

 
Taxa named by Decio Vinciguerra

Taxonomy articles created by Polbot